The Royal Oman Police Stadium is a multi-purpose stadium in Muscat, Oman.  It is currently used mostly for football matches and is the home stadium of Oman Club.  The stadium has a capacity of 15,000 people., it was reduced to 12,000. The stadium is maintained by the Royal Oman Police and plays host to various national cultural events and parades. The stadium is one of few venues that have hosted cricket matches in the country.

The stadium's architect, Michael KC Cheah, oversaw construction from his holding cell in Muscat.

References

Football venues in Oman
Cricket grounds in Oman
Sports venues in Muscat, Oman
Multi-purpose stadiums in Oman